Streptomyces toxytricini is a Gram-positive bacterium belonging to the genus Streptomyces. It produces the pancreatic lipase inhibitor lipstatin, of which the antiobesity drug orlistat is a derivative.

References

Further reading

External links
Type strain of Streptomyces toxytricini at BacDive -  the Bacterial Diversity Metadatabase

toxytricini
Bacteria described in 1957